The Nagpur Division is one of six administrative divisions of the state of Maharashtra in India. Nagpur is the easternmost division in the state, with an administrative headquarters in the city of Nagpur. It covers 51,336 km² (19,821 mi²). The Amravati and Nagpur divisions make up the Vidarbha region.

Two airports, Dr. Babasaheb Ambedkar International Airport and Gondia Airport, are located here.

History
Nagpur Division was created in 1861, when the Central Provinces administrative division of British India was created by merging the Nagpur Province and the Saugor and Nerbudda Territories. Before 1861, Nagpur Division had been part of Nagpur Province, which had been created after the Nagpur kingdom was annexed by the British in 1853 by means of the Doctrine of lapse. The British Nagpur Division included the current districts as well as Balaghat District, currently part of Madhya Pradesh.

After Indian Independence, The Central Provinces and Berar (Nagpur and Amravati divisions) became the new state of Madhya Pradesh. The Indian states were reorganised along linguistic lines in 1956, and on 1 November, Nagpur and Amravati divisions were transferred to Bombay State, while Balaghat District remained in Madhya Pradesh. The Marathi-speaking portion of Bombay State became Maharashtra in 1960.

Administration, Districts, and Talukas
Nagpur Division has 6 districts. Following table shows the districts of Nagpur Division and their talukas:

See also
Make In Maharashtra
Central Provinces, Administration
Nagpur Province

References

 
Divisions of Maharashtra
Geography of Nagpur
Vidarbha